Cryptorhynchus lapathi  is a species of weevil native to Europe. Its common names include poplar and willow borer, osier weevil, and willow weevil.

This weevil has long been known as a pest insect of willows cultivated for basketry.

References

Cryptorhynchinae
Beetles described in 1758
Beetles of Europe
Taxa named by Carl Linnaeus